Pheasants Forever, Inc. (PF), a 501(c)(3) non-profit conservation organization, is dedicated to conserving wildlife habitat suitable for pheasants. Formed in 1982 as a response to the continuing decline of upland wildlife and habitat throughout the United States, Pheasants Forever, and its quail conservation division, Quail Forever, have a combined membership of approximately 150,000 throughout North America.

History
Pheasants Forever began in Saint Paul, Minnesota in 1982 as a response to the decline of pheasant numbers in the state; the result of substantial losses of habitat suitable for pheasants as farming practices intensified. Pheasants Forever was created to return those grassland acres back into wildlife habitat.

Dennis Anderson, outdoor editor for the Saint Paul Pioneer Press and Dispatch wrote an article March 7, 1982, regarding the state of grassland habitat in Minnesota. After the article appeared, Anderson received over 100 written responses and 50 phone calls, voicing concerns for the state of upland and it has a lot of birds during mating season habitat and the state's upland game bird. It was from this article that the concept of Pheasants Forever was formed and, shortly after, Anderson and some friends established Pheasants Forever.

The first Pheasants Forever banquet was held April 15, 1983 at the former Prom Center on University Avenue in St. Paul. Over 800 people attended, including famed water fowler and outdoors writer Jimmy Robinson, who presented two $1,000 checks to the organization, one from him and one from the Robert Naegele Sr.

The keynote speaker at the inaugural Pheasants Forever banquet was the governor of Minnesota, Rudy Perpich, who later signed the state's first pheasant stamp bill. To date, the state pheasant stamp has raised over $14.6 Million for pheasant habitat and development on private and public lands, and for public land acquisition. The stamp costs $7.50 and it is required of pheasant hunters age 18 and older.

Membership growth
 1983: 1,000 members
 1984: 3,000 members
 1985: 6,000 members
 1986: 12,000 members
 1987: 25,000 members
 1988: 34,250 members
 1989: 46,000 members
 1999: 60,000 members

Organization

Pheasants Forever uses a grassroots system of fundraising and project development that allows members to see the direct result of their contributions. This is accomplished through Pheasants Forever and Quail Forever local chapters determining how 100% of their locally raised funds will be spent. Pheasants Forever and Quail Forever have a combined 700 local chapters throughout the United States and Canada.

Organizational projects

Pheasants Forever and Quail Forever have chapters in 40 states, members in all other states and chapters in their sister organization, Pheasants Forever Canada. The organization participates in habitat projects on local and national levels, and has an average annual completion of 20,000+ habitat projects. Pheasants Forever wildlife habitat projects have been completed in conjunction with local, state and federal natural resource agencies, and all of those projects have subsequently been opened to public hunting or compatible outdoor recreational use.

Since 1982, Pheasants Forever and Quail Forever have enhanced over —including planting grasslands, restoring wetlands, planting woody cover or food plots and purchased lands to provide habitat for pheasant, quail and other wildlife. This total also includes  approximately 400,000 wildlife habitat projects, which have helped pheasant, quail and other wildlife.

Pheasants Forever and Quail Forever chapters hold more than 500 youth events per annum, with 25,000 plus youth to the outdoors. Many of the organizations' chapters provide educators with scholarships to attend Leopold Education Project workshops (named after the environmentalist writer, Aldo Leopold). The educators facilitate youth mentor hunts, outdoor conservation days, shooting sports, competitive events, conservation camps, and youth fishing tournaments, outdoor expos, hunter education classes, schoolyard habitats and much more.

The No Child Left Indoors initiative builds on Pheasants Forever and Quail Forever's Leopold Education Project and chapter youth events with youth and family programs. The No Child Left Indoors initiative is carried out through youth habitat projects, youth and family community events and youth outdoor education programs hosted by chapters and volunteers across the country.

The grassroots conservation campaign was formed by the organization with the goal of raising $25 million in planned gifts, estate, bequests and other donations. The objective of the campaign is to accelerate the organization's ability to conserve and enhance North America|North America's wildlife resources as well as Americans' hunting traditions.

Statistics 
Minnesota's conservation groups
 Ducks Unlimited, 42,000
 National Wild Turkey Federation, 26,000
 Pheasants Forever, 22,500
 Minnesota Deer Hunters Association, 20,000
 Minnesota Waterfowl Association

Top five states for Pheasants Forever members
 Minnesota, 23,800
 Iowa, 18,900
 Nebraska, 10,300
 Michigan, 7,900
 Illinois and Wisconsin, 7,500

References

Environmental organizations based in the United States
Ornithological organizations in the United States